Seyyed Mehdi Sajjadi is an Iranian football forward who currently plays for Aluminium Arak in the Persian Gulf Pro League.

References

Living people
People from Arak, Iran
1997 births
Association football forwards
Iranian footballers
Aluminium Arak players
Persian Gulf Pro League players